James Kirchick (born 1983) is an American reporter, foreign correspondent, author, and columnist. He has been described as a conservative or neoconservative.

Career 
Kirchick was raised in a Jewish family and attended Yale University, where he wrote for its student newspaper, the Yale Daily News.

For over three years, Kirchick worked at The New Republic, covering domestic politics, intelligence, and American foreign policy. Later, he was writer-at-large for Radio Free Europe/Radio Liberty based in Prague.

Kirchick has worked as a reporter for The New York Sun, the New York Daily News, and The Hill, and has been a columnist for the New York Daily News and the Washington Examiner. He has received the National Lesbian and Gay Journalists Association Excellence in Student Journalism Award and the Journalist of the Year Award. Kirchick was previously a fellow for the think tank Foreign Policy Initiative. As the Foreign Policy Initiative was shutting down in 2017, Kirchick announced that he would be moving to the Brookings Institution in Washington. His role at Brookings was as a visiting fellow.

Ron Paul newsletters 

In 2008, Kirchick wrote about newsletters that contained homophobic, conspiratorial and racist material, published under the name of Texas Congressman and Republican presidential candidate Ron Paul. The story again became prominent in the 2012 presidential election.

It was later claimed by television station WXIX that Ron Paul was not the author of the newsletter segments which contained the material in question. In their second newscast on the scandal in January 2012, based on information provided by Lew Rockwell, who had also worked on the newsletter, WXIX's Reality Check claimed that the offending articles may have been written by one of the freelance writers who were said to have been employed at the time.

Erik Wemple for The Washington Post wrote an article that included Kirchick's response to WXIX's second newscast, where Kirchick implied that the writer of the WXIX article, Ben Swann, was incorrect in his naming of the supposed writer of the "Special Edition on Racial Terrorism".

Ron Paul did not initially deny authorship of the offending material, though he had begun denying it by 2001. He has accepted responsibility for the content regardless of its author, as it was published under his name.

August 2013 RT appearance 
Immediately after U.S. Army soldier Chelsea Manning's July 30, 2013 court-martial conviction of, among other charges, violations of the Espionage Act, Kirchick wrote in the Daily News that Manning was "lucky not to be headed to the electric chair." On August 21, on RT (formerly Russia Today), he participated in a live panel awaiting Manning's sentencing, Kirchick refused to discuss Manning, instead protesting the Russian LGBT propaganda law. When asked if he was ready to have a conversation about Manning with the assembled panel, Kirchick retorted angrily: "RT has been Bradley Manning and Edward Snowden 24/7. I haven't seen anything on your network about the anti-gay laws that have been passed in Russia and the increasing climate of violence and hostility towards gay people." One of the program's hosts objected, saying they had a panel discussing it only the day before and after refusing to follow the course of discussion set by RT. Kirchick's video link was taken off air.

Later that day, Politico reached out to both Kirchick and RT for comment. Kirchick called for a "boycott" of RT, calling its employees "not journalists, they're propagandists". RT responded in an e-mail, calling Kirchick's protest "unrelated to the subject of the panel. Regretfully, RT had no other recourse but to continue the discussion without him". The Washington Post PostPartisan blogger Jonathan Capehart commended Kirchick for his "heroic" action; The New Republic's Julia Ioffe praised Kirchick's "trolling of RT"; and the next day, The Washington Post published Kirchick's opinion piece titled "Why I ambushed Russia's news network with rainbow suspenders." In it, Kirchick further denounced RT as broadcasting "sophisticated conspiracy theories and anti-establishment attitudes to push a virulently anti-American and illiberal agenda", while relying on "a pool of talking heads, including 9/11 truthers, anti-Semites, and other assorted extremists, who espouse the sort of views found where the far left and the far right converge". A day later, MSNBC host Lawrence O'Donnell invited Kirchick onto his show where they discussed related concerns and controversies at the 2014 Winter Olympics in Russia.

2016 presidential elections 

Kirchick supported Democratic Party candidate Hillary Clinton over the Republican Party candidate Donald Trump for the presidency during the 2016 presidential elections. He described Trump as a "brashly authoritarian populist" and Clinton as "not only ... the obvious choice for those who don’t want to see our country degenerate into a banana republic, she’s the clear conservative choice as well."

On August 15, 2016, The Daily Beast published an article by Kirchick which listed Jill Stein, Rania Khalek, Corey Robin, Glenn Greenwald, Ishaan Tharoor, Katrina vanden Heuvel, and others as "Hillary Clinton-Loathing, Donald Trump-Loving Useful Idiots of the Left". Ben Norton, writing for the Salon website, enquired to those mentioned in the article and received responses from them, 13 of the 14 indicated they would not be voting for Trump. The exception, Christopher Ketcham, claimed to vote for him not because he "loves" or "admires" him, but precisely because he says the GOP nominee "is an ignorant, vicious, narcissistic, racist, capitalist scumbag, and thus an accurate representative of the United States."

Assessment of Ukraine debate 
With his September 29, 2022 article in The Atlantic entitled How the Anti-war Camp Went Intellectually Bankrupt, Kirchick joined a growing dialogue regarding the pros and the cons on the topic of supporting Ukraine against the invasion by Russia in 2022. His article reviewed extensive discussion ensuing in media and compared it to international dialogue regarding the incidents that led to World War I and World War II, assessing comparisons to contemporary international commentary regarding the conflict between Ukraine and Russia. His article garnered further commentary from authors such as Matt Taibbi as they both focused upon a quote of George Orwell,<ref>Taibbi, Matt, On John Lennon's Birthday, a Few Words About War: Why "pacifists" aren't "fascifists", TK News, Substack, October 9, 2022</ref> which in fact, was repudiated by Orwell in his As I Please column in the Tribune on December 8, 1944, but nonetheless, persists frequently as a topic of discussion among contemporary authors, bloggers, commentators, and on social media. 

 Books 
   On LGBT culture in Washington, D.C.
 The End of Europe: Dictators, Demagogues, and the Coming Dark Age'' (Yale University Press), 2017

Awards 
 2006 National Lesbian and Gay Journalists Association Excellence in Student Journalism
 2007 National Lesbian and Gay Journalists Association Journalist of the Year

References 

1983 births
Living people
21st-century American journalists
American columnists
American foreign policy writers
American male non-fiction writers
American male journalists
American gay writers
Jewish American journalists
Jewish American writers
LGBT Jews
American LGBT journalists
LGBT conservatism in the United States
Neoconservatism
The New Republic people
Radio Free Europe/Radio Liberty people
Never Trump movement
Yale University alumni